Mick Bradley (1947 – 8 February 1972) was a British drummer and vocalist, known for being a member of the blues-rock band Steamhammer. He played on three Steamhammer albums.

In 1969, Bradley played drums on the Methuselah album by the late 1960s band Methuselah. He then joined Steamhammer, taking over from Michael Rushton, and played drums on the Mk II (1969), Mountains (1970), and Speech (1972) albums. He also played percussion and conga.

Bradley died on 8 February 1972, aged 25. He died from undiagnosed leukemia shortly before the mixing of the Speech album was completed. The album is dedicated to him on the inside album cover and the band dissolved the following year, making Speech the final Steamhammer album. A memorial concert took place at the Marquee Club in London on 14 March 1972, with appearances by the bands Atomic Rooster, Beggars Opera, If, and Gringo.

References

1947 births
1972 deaths
English rock drummers
Blues drummers
Blues rock musicians
British male drummers
Steamhammer (band) members
Deaths from leukemia
Deaths from cancer in the United Kingdom
20th-century British male musicians